This is a list of people associated with the New York University Graduate School of Arts and Science, a school within New York University (NYU) founded in 1886 by Henry Mitchell MacCracken.

Notable faculty

Alumni
(*did not graduate)

Nobel laureates

Pulitzer Prize winners

Other

(*did not graduate)

References

External links
New York University

Lists of people by university or college in New York City

New York University-related lists